National Olympic may refer to
 National Olympic Committee, the national constituent of the worldwide Olympic movement.
 Phnom Penh Olympic Stadium, a stadium in Cambodia.
 Olympic National Park, a national park in the United States.